Hypericum balearicum is a species of flowering plant in the family Hypericaceae, native to Spain's Balearic Islands. It is the only species in the section Psorophytum.

Its stems are glandular and warty, yellow-green when young, becoming reddish-brown as it ages. The leaves have rounded tips, undulate margins, and broadly cuneate to rounded bases. They are leathery, with prominent warty glands, and paler underneath.

Its warty stems and leaves and its involucre-like bracts distinguish it from other species of Hypericum.

Distribution and habitatH. balearicum is confined to the Balearic Islands (Mallorca, Menorca, Ibiza, Cabrera, and Dragonera). It is common on Mallorca but rare on the other islands. It has been introduced to Italy.

References

 California Flora Nursery 
 J.D. Curtis and N.R. Lersten, "Internal secretory structures in Hypericum (Hypericaceae): H. perforatum L. and H. balearicum L.", New Phytologist'', volume 114, issue 4, pages 571-580, April 28, 2006.

balearicum
Flora of the Balearic Islands
Plants described in 1753
Taxa named by Carl Linnaeus